Tim Singh Grover is a businessman, motivational speaker, personal trainer, and owner of Attack Athletics. Grover is recognized as the trainer to some of the most elite, iconic athletes in the world, including the late Kobe Bryant, Dwyane Wade and Michael Jordan. In 2020, Grover was featured in ESPN’s 10-episode biopic documentary about Jordan and the Chicago Bulls during their 1997-1998 Championship title season, entitled The Last Dance.

Grover has a BS and MS in Kinesiology from the College of Applied Health Sciences at the University of Illinois at Chicago.

In 2010, UIC gave Grover a Lifetime Achievement Award; he was later inducted into the UIC Hall of Fame.

In 2018, he was the recipient of the AHS Distinguished Alumni Achievement Award.

Early life
Tim's parents are from India. They moved to London once they were married. Tim and his brother were born in London. Tim's mother was a hospital nurse, and she decided to work in the United States because she wanted a better life for their children. She lived alone in Chicago for a year until they had enough for the rest of the family to join her. Tim moved to Chicago when he was four years old. His father took up a job in her hospital's basement dealing with corpses.

References

American businesspeople
Living people
Year of birth missing (living people)